"I Will Get There" is a single recorded by Boyz II Men in 1998 for the soundtrack of the DreamWorks animated film The Prince of Egypt. The track spent 7 weeks on the Billboard Hot 100 chart, and, as of May 2018, remains to be the group's final Top 40 hit.

The song was written by Diane Warren and produced by Jimmy Jam, Terry Lewis and Boyz II Men. The group sings the song a cappella for the recording, which peaked at number thirty-two on the Hot 100 when released as a single. The music video for "I Will Get There" was directed by Darren Grant.

Track listing 
 "I Will Get There" (Build Up Edit) – 4:06
 "I Will Get There" (Build Up Mix) – 4:17
 "I Will Get There" (LP version) – 4:20
 "I Will Get There" (a cappella with strings) – 4:18

References

External links 
 

1998 songs
1998 singles
1990s ballads
Boyz II Men songs
Music videos directed by Darren Grant
Songs written by Diane Warren
Song recordings produced by Jimmy Jam and Terry Lewis
Songs from The Prince of Egypt
Gospel songs